Ace of Action is a 1926 American silent Western film directed by William Bertram and starring Hal Taliaferro, Alma Rayford and Charles Colby.

Plot synopsis 
A feud develops between two families, the Waltons and the Darcys, regarding ownership of a valuable waterhole.  John Walton believes the dispute should be settled by an outside party.

Farber (Charles Colby), an attorney from back east, impersonates Walton's missing heir.

Wally Rand (Hal Taliaferro), is a young cowboy and innocent bystander who falls in love with June Darcy (Alma Rayford).  Wally is drawn into the feud when he is mistaken for Walton's rightful heir.

Farber is exposed as an imposter and is arrested.

Lafe Darcy and Farber plot to kidnap Wally, but June frees him.  Wally fights with Lafe and ultimately resolves the differences and settles the feud.

Cast
 Hal Taliaferro as Wally Rand 
 Alma Rayford as June Darcy 
 Charles Colby as Farber 
 Hank Bell
 Slim Whitaker
 Fanny Midgley
 William T. Hayes 
 Frank Ellis

References

External links
 

1926 films
1926 Western (genre) films
American black-and-white films
Associated Exhibitors films
1920s English-language films
Films directed by William Bertram
Silent American Western (genre) films
1920s American films